Roberto Boninsegna ( born 13 November 1943) is an Italian former football player, who mainly played as a forward. After retiring, he worked as a football manager. As a player, he represented the Italy national side at two World Cups, reaching the final in 1970.

Club career
Born at Mantua, Boninsegna started his career in Serie B (the second tier of Italian professional football) with Prato in 1963–64 season. He transferred to Potenza, who was Serie B team in 1964–65 season. He also played for Varese in 1965–66 and Cagliari between 1966 and 1969, helping the club to a second-place finish during the 1968–69 Serie A season alongside Luigi Riva. During the summer of 1967, Cagliari came to the United States to play in the North American Soccer League as the Chicago Mustangs; Boninsegna led the club in scoring with 11 goals in nine matches.  Boninsegna gained a status as an efficient striker with Internazionale Milano F.C. and the Italy national team in the 1970s, playing alongside Sandro Mazzola. In Serie A, he totaled 171 goals in 281 games, and was top goalscorer in Italy during the 1970–71 and 1971–72 Serie A seasons, with Inter.

After moving to Inter in 1969, he also won the 1970–71 Serie A title with the club, and reached the 1972 European Cup Final, only to be defeated by Ajax. He transferred to Juventus F.C. in 1976 in exchange for Pietro Anastasi, and he played 3 seasons for the club, winning two Serie A titles, a Coppa Italia, and an UEFA Cup. After leaving Juventus in 1979, he finished his career with Verona, retiring from professional football at the end of the 1979–80 Serie B season.

International career
Boninsegna made his debut for Italy on 18 November 1967, in an away UEFA Euro 1968 qualifying match against Switzerland, which ended 2–2, although he was not called up for the final tournament, which Italy ended up winning on home soil under manager Ferruccio Valcareggi, with whom he would have several disagreements throughout his international career. With the national side, he took part in two World Cups, the first in 1970, and the second in 1974. In total, he managed 9 goals for Italy in 22 appearances.

Boninsegna was a member of the Italian side that reached the final of the 1970 FIFA World Cup in Mexico, scoring two goals throughout the tournament. In the epic semi-final match against West-Germany, he scored a goal, and later set up Gianni Rivera's match-winning goal in extra time, which allowed Italy to advance to the final after a 4–3 victory. He scored Italy's only goal (though at the time it was an important equaliser) in the final against Brazil, which Italy ultimately lost 4–1; he came off for Rivera in the final minutes of the game.

Style of play

As a player, Boninsegna was a powerful, agile and acrobatic striker, who was known for his accurate finishing ability and intelligence in the penalty area. He was a prolific goalscorer, who excelled in the air, despite not being particularly tall or imposing physically. He was also gifted with pace, stamina, technical ability, opportunism and outstanding consistency, which enabled him to become one of the top Italian forwards of his generation. Because of his jumping ability and his power and accuracy with his head, the Italian sports journalist Gianni Brera gave him the nickname "Bonimba". Despite his talent, he was criticised on occasion for being a selfish player, although he was also capable of creating chances for teammates. He was also well known for his on the field rivalry with Juventus defender Francesco Morini, who later became his teammate.

Career statistics

Club

International
Source

Honours

Club
Inter Milan
Serie A: 1970–71

Juventus
Serie A: 1976–77, 1977–78
Coppa Italia: 1978–79
UEFA Cup: 1976–77

International
Italy
FIFA World Cup runner-up: 1970

Individual
Serie A Top scorer: 1970–71, 1971–72
Coppa Italia Top scorer: 1971–72
United Soccer Association Top Scorer: 1967

References

External links
 Roberto Boninsegna at Inter.it

1943 births
Living people
Sportspeople from Mantua
Inter Milan players
Italian footballers
Italy international footballers
A.C. Prato players
Juventus F.C. players
Cagliari Calcio players
Serie A players
Serie B players
1970 FIFA World Cup players
1974 FIFA World Cup players
United Soccer Association players
S.S.D. Varese Calcio players
Mantova 1911 players
Hellas Verona F.C. players
Potenza S.C. players
Chicago Mustangs (1967–68) players
Association football forwards
UEFA Cup winning players
Footballers from Lombardy